Border Vengeance may refer to:
 Border Vengeance (1935 film), an American Western B movie
 Border Vengeance (1925 film), an American silent Western film